Shankar Chaudhary (born 3 December 1970) is an Indian politician from Gujarat state. He is the Speaker of Gujarat Legislative Assembly since December 2022. He was the Member of Legislative Assembly from 1998 to 2017 and again since 2022.

Political career 
He contested his first ever election of the Legislative Assembly at the age of just 27 years against the then Chief Minister Shankarsinh Vaghela in 1997 from Radhanpur. However, in the subsequent election held in 1998, he was elected the Member of the Legislative Assembly from Radhanpur constituency.

He was the Minister of State for Health and Family Welfare, Medical Education, Environment (All Independent charges) and Urban Development, Government of Gujarat under Anandiben Patel ministry.

In 2015, he was elected unopposed as the chairman of Banaskantha District Cooperative Milk Federation, Palanpur (Banas Dairy) ending 24-year reign of Parthi Bhatol. He is also as the Chairman of the Banaskantha District Central Co-operative Bank and Vice-Chairman of The Gujarat State Co-operative Bank and General Secretary of the Gujarat Pradesh Bharatiya Janta Party.

He lost in 2017 Gujarat Legislative Assembly election from Vav against Indian National Congress candidate Geniben Thakor.

He was elected from Tharad constituency in 2022 Gujarat Legislative Assembly election. He was elected as the Speaker of Gujarat Legislative Assembly on 20 December 2022.

References

Living people
Bharatiya Janata Party politicians from Gujarat
Gujarat MLAs 1998–2002
Gujarat MLAs 2002–2007
Gujarat MLAs 2007–2012
Gujarat MLAs 2012–2017
1970 births
People from Banaskantha district
Gujarat MLAs 2022–2027